Samuel Joseph Aquila (born September 24, 1950) is an American prelate of the Roman Catholic Church.  He currently serves as the fifth archbishop of the Archdiocese of Denver in Colorado. He previously served as the seventh bishop of the Diocese of Fargo in North Dakota.  Additionally, he serves on the board of directors at FOCUS (Fellowship of Catholic University Students).

Biography

Early life 
Samuel Aquila was born on September 24, 1950 in Burbank, California.  He was  ordained a priest by Archbishop James Casey on June 5, 1976, for the Archdiocese of Denver.  From 1999 to 2001, Aquila served as the first rector of St. John Vianney Seminary in Denver and chief executive officer of Our Lady of the New Advent Theological Institute at St. John Vianney.  In 2000, Pope John Paul II named Aquila an honorary prelate.

Coadjutor Bishop and Bishop of Fargo

On May 29, 2001, Pope John Paul II named Aquila as coadjutor Bishop of the Diocese of Fargo.  He was consecrated on August 24, 2001 by Archbishop Harry Flynn. Aquila automatically became Bishop of Fargo on March 18, 2002, succeeding Bishop James Sullivan.

From 2005 to 2006, Aquila served as interim administrator of the Diocese of Sioux Falls in South Dakota until the consecration of Paul J. Swain as bishop of that diocese in October 2006.

Archbishop of Denver
On May 29, 2012, Aquila was named by Pope Benedict XVI as archbishop of the Archdiocese of Denver. Aquila was installed in a ceremony on July 18 at the Cathedral Basilica of the Immaculate Conception in Denver.

See also

 Catholic Church hierarchy
 Catholic Church in the United States
 Historical list of the Catholic bishops of the United States
 List of Catholic bishops of the United States
 Lists of patriarchs, archbishops, and bishops

References

External links

 Roman Catholic Archdiocese of Denver Official Site

Episcopal succession

 

21st-century Roman Catholic archbishops in the United States
Roman Catholic archbishops of Denver
Roman Catholic bishops of Fargo
People from Burbank, California
1950 births
Living people
Catholics from California
Catholics from Colorado